Colognac is a commune in the Gard department in southern France.

Geography

Climate

Colognac has a warm-summer Mediterranean climate (Köppen climate classification Csb).

Population

See also
Communes of the Gard department

References

Communes of Gard